Deepnarayan Gupta is an electrical engineer at HYPRES, Inc., in Elmsford, New York. He was named a Fellow of the Institute of Electrical and Electronics Engineers (IEEE) in 2015 for his contributions to superconductor digital radio frequency receivers.

References

Fellow Members of the IEEE
Living people
Year of birth missing (living people)
Place of birth missing (living people)
American electrical engineers